The 85 Fund, also known as the Honest Elections Project, and formerly known as the Judicial Education Project, is a 501(c)(3) organization based in Washington D.C. It is among a network of conservative organizations associated with Leonard Leo, a longtime prominent figure in the Federalist Society, that are funded mostly by anonymous donors. The 85 Fund was founded to counter the influence of Arabella Advisors, a liberal group with a similar structure. The 85 Fund had revenue of over $65 million in 2020 and, with the Concord Fund, acts as a funding hub for other organizations in the Leo network.

Organization and finances 

The secretary of The 85 Fund is Carrie Severino, who is the president of the Judicial Crisis Network. The 85 Fund is closely connected to Leonard Leo, the vice president of the Federalist Society.  The group's 2017 tax return listed a payment of $675,000 to the BH Group, an employer of Leo. Neil Corkery formerly served as president of the group.

Between 2012 and 2017, the group raised $46 million. In 2018, more than 99% of the group's funding came from a single $7.8 million donation from Donors Trust, a donor-advised fund. In 2020, The 85 Fund received $20 million in donations from Donors Trust.

Expenditures 
The group donated $300,000 to the Independent Women's Forum, a conservative nonprofit organization.

In 2020, The 85 Fund provided $750,000 in funding to the Mercatus Center, a think tank affiliated with George Mason University. 

In 2020, The 85 Fund donated $1 million to the Accountability and Civics Trust Project, formerly run by Matthew Whitaker. The Accountability and Civics Trust Project filed a complaint to the Office of Special Council to investigate Jennifer Granholm, the current United States Secretary of Energy. 

In 2020, The 85 Fund donated $2 million to the Government Accountability Institute, a group founded by former White House strategist Steve Bannon and investigator Peter Schweizer and chaired by Rebekah Mercer.

Honest Elections Project 

In April 2020, the Honest Elections Project (HEP) announced it was launching a week-long $250,000 digital and television ad campaign on Fox News, MSNBC, and CNN against mail-in voting.

Lawyers contracted by HEP sent letters to the secretaries of state in Colorado, Florida, and Michigan to lobby for purges of voter rolls in these states. The Guardian reported that these letters used "misleading data to accuse jurisdictions of having bloated voter rolls" and threatened legal action. HEP filed legal briefs in favor of voting restrictions in Nevada, Virginia, Texas, and Minnesota.

In 2020, The 85 Fund provided $70,000 in funding to HEP. 

In September 2020, HEP was involved in legal action concerning whether mail-in ballots that were postmarked before the election but arrived up to 14 days after it should be counted; the suit was successful.  

HEP concluded that there was no widespread fraud in the 2020 United States presidential election and did not participate in any litigation to try to challenge or overturn the election results. HEP issued a statement criticizing the 2021 United States Capitol attack that occurred on January 6, saying: "The violent insurrection at the Capitol was a heinous attack against democracy, the rule of law, and the election system HEP was created to defend.”  

In May 2021, HEP lobbied against H.R. 1, also known as the For the People Act. As of 2021, the executive director of HEP was Jason Snead.

HEP is a proponent of the independent state legislature theory that posits state legislatures have sole authority to establish and enforce state election laws and rules, without judicial or executive review. It has argued the doctrine in amicus briefs to the United States Supreme Court, which in June 2022 decided to hear a case brought by North Carolina Republicans during its next session beginning in October 2022. Critics of the doctrine said it might allow state legislatures controlled by one party, commonly made possible through gerrymandering, to decide the outcome of federal elections against the will of the majority of voters.

See also 
 Donors Capital Fund
 Donors Trust

References

External links 
 Honest Elections Project website

Charities based in Washington, D.C.
Voting in the United States
2011 establishments in Washington, D.C.
Conservative organizations in the United States